UNIFORM-1 or University International Formation Mission is a Japanese micro-satellite launched in 2014. The satellite is built around a wildfire detection camera and features the following instruments:
 Microbolometer infrared camera with resolution 200m and swath width 100 km.
 visible-light camera to assist in wildfire detection
All instruments are powered by solar cells mounted on the spacecraft body and stub wings, with estimated electrical power of over 100W.

Launch
UNIFORM-1 was launched from Tanegashima, Japan, on 24 May 2014 at 03:05:00 UTC by an H-IIA 202.

Mission
The satellite is intended for wildfire detection, especially in the south-east Asia region. The satellite has a less accurate infrared sensor compared to other infrared satellites, but an envisioned constellation of UNIFORM satellites would allow for a short revisit time at the fraction of the cost of the Landsat 7 or MODIS satellites. Mission data is down-linked in S-band and X-band, while control up-link is S-band only.

The Wakayama University and JAXA has refused to publish data and/or information which are not officially published.

See also

 2014 in spaceflight
Moderate-Resolution Imaging Spectroradiometer
Advanced Very High Resolution Radiometer
Advanced Spaceborne Thermal Emission and Reflection Radiometer
Landsat 7

References

External links
UNIFORM-1 mission overview 

Earth observation satellites of Japan
Spacecraft launched by H-II rockets
Spacecraft launched in 2014